Heliardo Vieira da Silva (born 14 December 1991) is a Brazilian footballer who plays for Portuguese club Penafiel.

References

1991 births
Sportspeople from Goiás
Living people
Brazilian footballers
Association football forwards
Esporte Clube Pelotas players
Cianorte Futebol Clube players
Oeste Futebol Clube players
Clube Esportivo Bento Gonçalves players
Esporte Clube São José players
Joinville Esporte Clube players
C.D. Tondela players
F.C. Arouca players
Varzim S.C. players
Gyeongnam FC players
F.C. Penafiel players
Campeonato Paranaense players
Campeonato Brasileiro Série B players
Primeira Liga players
Liga Portugal 2 players
Campeonato de Portugal (league) players
K League 2 players
Brazilian expatriate footballers
Brazilian expatriate sportspeople in Portugal
Expatriate footballers in Portugal
Brazilian expatriate sportspeople in South Korea
Expatriate footballers in South Korea